Mohamed Ben Attia, born January 5, 1976, in Tunis, is a Tunisian director and screenwriter.

Early life and education
Born in 1976 in Tunis, Tunisia, he graduated from the Institute of Higher Commercial Studies of Carthage in 1998. Then, he projected a film career and tried to enter La Femis in Paris, which he was denied access after the third and final round of selections. A few years later, Ben Attia is holder of a diploma of specialized higher studies in audio-visual communication obtained at the university of Valenciennes.

Career
After various jobs in audiovisual post-production, he was finally hired for twelve years in a commercial position and prospecting at a car dealership in Tunis.

Trained at the writing workshop Sud Écriture in Tunis, he began writing and directing several short fiction films, starting with  Romantisme : deux comprimés matin et soir in 2005. His second short film : Comme les autres (Kif Lokhrim) was produced in 2006. After Mouja, unveiled at the Carthage Film Festival 2010 and selected at CinemAfrica 2011 in Stockholm, he directed Loi 76 (2011), his fourth short film, then Selma (2013).

He moved to feature film in 2016 with Hedi, a wind of freedom produced by Dora Bouchoucha (Nomadis Images) and co-produced by the Dardenne brothers (Les Films du Fleuve), convinced by his latest short film and script.

In 2018, he participated in the Cannes Film Festival where his film Dear Son is screened at the Directors' Fortnight.

Filmography 
 2005 : Romantisme : deux comprimés matin et soir (short fiction)
 2006 : Comme les autres (short fiction)
 2010 : Mouja (short fiction)
 2011 : Loi 76 (short fiction)
 2013 : Selma (short film)
 2016 : Hedi, a wind of freedom (feature film)
 2018 : Dear Son (feature film)

Awards 
 2006
Silver award at Fespaco for Comme les autres
 Best Berlinale premiere at the Berlinale for Hedi, a wind of freedom.
Diamond Valois (best film) at the Angoulême Francophone Film Festival for Hedi, a wind of freedom.
 City of Amiens Award (Best Director) and CCAS Award at the Amiens International Film Festival for Hedi, a wind of freedom.
 Golden Athena award (best film) at the Athens International Film Festival for Hedi, a wind of freedom. 
 Domaine Clarence Dillon Jury Grand Prix and Erasmus + Jury Prize at the Independent International Film Festival in Bordeaux for Hedi, a wind of freedom.
2017
 Prix Lumières for Best Francophone Film at the 22nd Annual Prix Lumières Ceremony for Hedi, a wind of freedom.
 First Feature Award at the COLCOA French Film Festival for Hedi, a wind of freedom.

References 

1976 births
Living people
Tunisian film directors
Tunisian screenwriters
People from Tunis